Gangapurna Lake is a glacial lake in Manang, Gandaki Province, Nepal. It was formed by glaciers from Mt Gangapurna (7,454m), Annapurna IV (7,525m), Khangsar Kang and Glacier Dom.

References

External links 

Glacial lakes of Nepal
Manang District, Nepal
Lakes of Gandaki Province